Domibacillus iocasae is a Gram-positive bacterium from the genus of Domibacillus which has been isolated from deep sea sediments from the Okinawa Trough.

References

External links 

Type strain of Domibacillus iocasae at BacDive -  the Bacterial Diversity Metadatabase

Bacillaceae
Bacteria described in 2016